The First Baptist Church of Council Grove, Kansas is a historic Baptist church.  Its historic building at 325 West Main Street was listed on the National Register of Historic Places in 1995.

Building
It is a one-story limestone and brick church. The historic building at 325 West Main Street was constructed for the congregation of the First Baptist Church of Council Grove in 1909.  The church building features Romanesque Revival and Gothic Revival elements.

Congregation
The congregation of the First Baptist Church of Council was organized on Dec. 3, 1870. It was located on Main street for many decades and moved to Country Lane in 1993, with the dedication of the new building on April 17, 1994.  The First Baptist congregation currently meets at 501 Country Lane in Council Grove.

References

Baptist churches in Kansas
Churches on the National Register of Historic Places in Kansas
Gothic Revival church buildings in Kansas
Romanesque Revival church buildings in Kansas
Churches completed in 1909
Buildings and structures in Morris County, Kansas
National Register of Historic Places in Morris County, Kansas
Relocated buildings and structures in the United States